Aliabad-e Ab Kaseh (also Romanized as ‘Alīābād-e Āb Kāseh; also known as ‘Alīābād) is a village in Dehdasht-e Gharbi Rural District, in the Central District of Kohgiluyeh County, Kohgiluyeh and Boyer-Ahmad Province, Iran. At the 2006 census, its population was 178, in 40 families.

References 

Populated places in Kohgiluyeh County